Ganpatsinh Vestabhai Vasava is a politician and cabinet minister in Government of Gujarat. He was a speaker of Gujarat Legislative Assembly in India from 2014 to 2016. He is a member of Bharatiya Janata Party.

Political career
He was elected from Mangrol constituency in Surat district for three terms as a candidate of BJP; in 2002, 2007 and 2012 assembly elections. He was the first tribal leader to serve as speaker and the youngest speaker in the history of assembly. He was elected as an assembly speaker in February 2011 and served until December 2012. He also served as cabinet minister of Forest and Environment, Tribal Welfare, Law and Parliamentary Affairs in 13th Gujarat Legislative Assembly from December 2012 to November 2014. He was again elected as a speaker of assembly in November 2014 and served till 7 August 2016.

References

Living people
People from Surat district
Speakers of the Gujarat Legislative Assembly
Gujarat MLAs 2002–2007
Gujarat MLAs 2007–2012
Gujarat MLAs 2012–2017
1971 births
Bharatiya Janata Party politicians from Gujarat
Gujarat MLAs 2017–2022
Gujarat MLAs 2022–2027